This article concerns football records in England. Unless otherwise stated, records are taken from the Football League or Premier League. Where a different record exists for the top flight (Football League First Division 1888–1992, and Premier League 1992–present), this is also given.

League
The original league saw 12 teams become the founding members of the Football League in 1888-89: Accrington, Blackburn Rovers, Bolton Wanderers, Burnley, Everton, Preston North End, Aston Villa, Derby County, Notts County, Stoke City, West Bromwich Albion and Wolverhampton Wanderers.

Three of the teams – Blackburn Rovers, Everton and Aston Villa – also played in the first Premier League season in 1992-93, but Notts County missed out, finishing in the relegation zone in 1991-92.

A second division was added four years later for the 1892-93 season, resulting in the Football League now becoming the Football League Division 1, the top division for the next one hundred years. The Southern League became Division 3 in 1920. A Northern League formed the following year that became Division 3 North. In 1958 the regional divisions combined to form divisions 3 and 4. The top 12 sides from the Northern and Southern divisions formed League division 3. The bottom 12 of the respective divisions formed league division 4.

Eight clubs have reached double figures of league titles, with Liverpool and Manchester United leading the chasing pack. Five clubs have managed to win all four divisions, a rare achievement while a further seven clubs need the top title to complete the full set. Luton Town can claim a quadruple of titles when they won the National League, after becoming the non-league champions in 2014.

Most League Titles Won (top 10)

Five Clubs Have Won All Four Divisions

Seven Clubs Have Won Bottom 3 Divisions

For the 1919/20 season, the first season after the First World War, Arsenal were controversially elected in to the first division, where they have remained to this day. Arsenal finished fifth in the last season before the outbreak of war in the second division. Arsenal had once previously won promotion after finishing second behind Preston North End in the 1903/04 season, staying there until finishing bottom in 1912/13. Other clubs won elections to play in the first division. Blackburn Rovers and Newcastle United in 1898, Bury and Notts County in 1905 and Chelsea (alongside Arsenal) in 1919 were also elected to the top flight. Blackburn later won division 2 in 1938/39, Newcastle United finished runners-up in 1947/48. Notts County became second division champions in 1913/14, while Bury would finish runners-up in 1923/24. In the 1929/30 season Chelsea finished second behind Blackpool.

Holding the record of continuous seasons, Arsenal are some way ahead of other clubs who have suffered relegation, returning by winning the division, finishing in an automatic promotion place or, more recently, via the play offs. Everton spent three years in the second division before winning division 2 in the 1953/54 season. Neighbours Liverpool, after having spent 8 years outside the top division, won the second division title in the 1961/62 season. Manchester United bounced straight back up in 1974/75, after finishing second bottom in 1973/74. This would be Manchester United’s last football league title before the birth of the Premier League, in their only time outside the top division since the end of the Second World War. Tottenham Hotspur also spent a season in division 2; similarly to Manchester United, it is the only time they have been outside the top flight since 1950. In 1976/77 Spurs conceded 72 goals as they finished bottom, the following season they finished third in the second division to earn promotion back to the top flight. Chelsea have been in the top flight since 1989 after winning the second division, while Manchester City were championship winners in 2002. The 1998/99 season saw Manchester City earn promotion from League 1, after winning a penalty shootout against Gillingham in the play-off final. City finished as runners-up to Charlton Athletic in the championship the following season, then made an immediate return after relegation in 2001, before securing their seventh second division title.

Unlike many European clubs that have never played outside their country's top division, no English club can claim that achievement. 65 clubs have played at the top level, 6 clubs have never returned, the rest, apart from Arsenal, have secured promotion from the second division. Glossop, Leyton Orient, Northampton Town, Carlisle United, Swindon Town, and Barnsley have completed only one season in the top flight. The club that can boast playing the most seasons in the top tier is Everton, who have played in 119 seasons of the 123 seasons completed. (The current 2022/23 season is the 124th season.) The city of Liverpool has always been represented in footballs top tier. While Everton suffered relegation in 1930, Liverpool remained. Everton after three years in the second division, between 1951–54, won promotion to division 1, swapping places with Liverpool who had been relegated. Next comes Aston Villa who, at the end of this season, will have played 109 seasons in the top tier. Liverpool will have played one less come May 2023, while Arsenal will have managed 106. Manchester United will become the fifth centurion in 2025, unless they are relegated beforehand.

Most Seasons in the Top Flight (Division 1 & Premier League - at end of current 2022/23 season)

Longest Ongoing Successive Seasons in the Top Flight (Division 1 + Premier League - at end of current 2022/23 season)

Longest Total Successive Seasons in the Top Flight (Division 1 + Premier League - at end of current 2022/23 season)

Champions of England 

Twenty four different football clubs have been crowned English champions since the league began in 1888. Some clubs have enjoyed regular success with others not so fortunate. Recently Liverpool ended a 30-year wait to become League champions again, but this is nowhere near the longest wait in history to once again be the English champions. Preston North End won the first two League titles but have never won it since 1890. Sheffield United won in 1898 but no second title has yet arrived. Their neighbours, Sheffield Wednesday, have won the league more recently than them, but have not added to their tally of four league titles, with their most recent success coming in 1930. Huddersfield Town won a hat-trick of titles between 1924 and 1926, but nearly a century later no fourth title has been added. It is approaching 96 years since Newcastle United were English champions while Tottenham have now gone 61 years without any league titles.  Chelsea had to wait 50 years before their Premier League success in 2005, although they did win the second division twice in the 1980s. Manchester City endured a bleak 44 years before new owners took them to the top in 2012. Manchester United went 41 years without the top title, but that time period includes two world wars, with eleven seasons lost. Arsenal are currently in their longest period without a league title, albeit by year, since first becoming English champions in 1931. Twice Arsenal went 18 years without a title, 1953 until 1971, then again until 1989. Arsenal last won the league in the 2003-04 season.

At end of the 2021/2022 season (*4 seasons **11 seasons lost during war years)

Titles 
Most League titles: 20, Manchester United
Most consecutive League titles: 3 
Huddersfield Town: 1923–24, 1924–25, 1925–26
Arsenal: 1932–33, 1933–34, 1934–35
Liverpool: 1981–82, 1982–83, 1983–84
Manchester United (twice): 
1998–99, 1999–2000, 2000–01
2006–07, 2007–08, 2008–09
 Most Second Division Titles (Championship): 7, Leicester City – Manchester City
 Most Third Division Titles (League 1): 4, Bristol City – Wigan Athletic – Doncaster Rovers – Hull City – Plymouth Argyle
 Most Fourth Division Titles (League 2): 4, Chesterfield

Representation
Most participants in top flight from one county: During the three consecutive seasons 1919–21, the historic boundaries (pre-1974) of the County of Lancashire had nine participants in the top-flight: Blackburn Rovers, Bolton Wanderers, Burnley, Everton, Liverpool, Manchester City, Manchester United, Oldham Athletic, and Preston North End.
During the Premier League era, there were eight participants in the historic county of Lancashire during the 2010–11 season: Blackburn Rovers, Blackpool, Bolton Wanderers, Everton, Liverpool, Manchester City, Manchester United, and Wigan Athletic.
Most participants in top flight from one city: During the season 1989–90, London had eight entrants in the top-flight: Arsenal, Charlton Athletic, Chelsea, Crystal Palace, Millwall, Queens Park Rangers, Tottenham Hotspur, and Wimbledon.
City represented with most seasons in top flight: Liverpool. The city has always had a top flight member of either Everton or Liverpool.

Wins
Most wins in the top-flight overall: 2,016, Liverpool
Most wins overall: 2,217, Manchester United
Most wins at home in top-flight overall: 1,246, Liverpool
Most wins at home overall: 1,409, Manchester United
Most wins away in top-flight overall: 693, Liverpool
Most wins away overall: 808, Manchester United
Most consecutive wins from start of a top-flight season: 11, Tottenham Hotspur (First Division, 1960–61)
Most consecutive wins from start of a season: 13, Reading (Third Division, 1985–86)
Most consecutive top-flight league wins: 18, joint record
Manchester City (26 August 2017 – 27 December 2017)
Liverpool (27 October 2019 – 24 February 2020)
Most consecutive wins (all competitions): 21, Manchester City (19 December 2020 – 2 March 2021)
Most consecutive top-flight league wins at home: 24, Liverpool (Premier League, 9 February 2019 – 11 July 2020)
Most consecutive top-flight league wins away: 12, Manchester City (Premier League, 19 December 2020 – 14 May 2021)
Most consecutive home wins: 25, Bradford (Park Avenue) (Third Division North, 1926–27)
Most wins in a top-flight season: 32, joint record 
Manchester City (Premier League, 2017–18 and 2018–19)
Liverpool (Premier League, 2019–20)

Draws
Most draws overall in the top flight: 1,159, Everton
Most draws in a season: 23, joint record:
Norwich City (from 42 games, First Division, 1978–79)
Exeter City (from 46 games, Fourth Division, 1986–87)
Hartlepool United (from 46 games, Third Division, 1997–98)
Cardiff City (from 46 games, Third Division, 1997–98)
Most consecutive draws: 8:
Torquay United (Third Division, 1969–70)
Middlesbrough (Second Division, 1970–71)
Peterborough United (Fourth Division, 1971–72)
Birmingham City (Third Division, 1990–91)
Chesterfield (League One, 2005–06)
Southampton (Championship, 2005–06)
Swansea City (Championship, 2008–09)

Losses
Most losses overall in the top flight: 1,595, Everton
Most losses in a season: 34, Doncaster Rovers, (Third Division, 1997–98; final record P46 W4 D8 L34)
Fewest losses in a season: 0, joint record:
Preston North End (First Division, 1888–89; final record P22 W18 D4 L0)
Liverpool (Second Division, 1893–94; final record P28 W22 D6 L0)
Arsenal (Premier League, 2003–04; final record P38 W26 D12 L0)
Most consecutive losses:
18, Darwen, 1898–99 (Second Division)
17, Rochdale, 1931–32 (Division 3 North)
17, Sunderland, 2002–03, 2003–04 (15 in top tier)

Points
Most points overall in the top flight (mixed 3pts for a win and 2pts for win): 7,099, Liverpool
Most points in a season (2 points for a win – 46 matches): 74, Lincoln City (Fourth Division, 1975–76)
Most points in a season (3 points for a win – 46 matches): 106, Reading (Championship, 2005–06)
Most points in a season for a top-flight team (2 points for a win – 42 matches): 68 (30 wins 8 draws), Liverpool (First Division, 1978–79)
Most points in a season for a top-flight team (3 points for a win – 42 matches): 92 (27 wins 11 draws), Manchester United (FA Premiership, 1993-94)
Most points in a season for a top-flight team (3 points for a win – 38 matches): 100 points (32 wins 4 draws), Manchester City (Premier League, 2017–18)
Fewest points in a season (2 points for a win – 34 matches): 8, joint record:
Loughborough (Second Division, 1899–1900)
Doncaster Rovers (Second Division, 1904–05)
Fewest points in a season (3 points for a win – 38 matches): 11, Derby County (Premier League, 2007–08)
Most points in a season while being relegated (2 points for a win – 46 matches): 41, Rotherham United (Third Division, 1972–73)
Most points in a season while being relegated (3 points for a win – 46 matches): 54, joint record:
Southend United (Third Division, 21st of 24; 1988–89)
Peterborough United (Championship, 22nd of 24; 2012–13)

Games without a win
Most consecutive league games without a win: 36, joint record:
 Derby County (Premier League/Championship; 22 September 2007 to 13 September 2008) 
 Macclesfield Town (League Two; 2 January to 5 May 2012 and 4 August to 12 October 2018).
Longest run without a home win: 364 days, Sunderland (Premier League/Championship; 17 December 2016 to 16 December 2017).

Games without defeat
Most consecutive games without a defeat: 78, AFC Wimbledon, (non-league football;  23 February 2003 to 27 November 2004)

Goals
Most league goals scored in a season: 134, Peterborough United (Fourth Division, 1960–61)
Most top-flight goals scored in a season (42 games): 128, Aston Villa (First Division, 1930–31)
Most top-flight goals scored in a season (38 games): 106, Manchester City (Premier League, 2017–18)
Most goals scored in all competitions in a season by a top-flight side: 169, Manchester City (2018–19)
Most top-flight goals scored in total: 7,161, Everton
Most home league goals scored in a season: 87, Millwall (Third Division South, 1927–28)
Most away league goals scored in a season: 60, Arsenal (First Division, 1930–31)
Most consecutive games scoring: 55, Arsenal (Premier League, 19 May 2001 – 30 November 2002)
Most consecutive games without scoring: 11, Coventry City (Second Division, 1919–20) and Hartlepool United (Third Division, 1992–93)
First league goal awarded by goal-line technology: scored by Edin Džeko in the 14th minute of the Premier League game between Manchester City and Cardiff City on 18 January 2014. The game was officiated by Neil Swarbrick, who consulted his watch when Cardiff defender Kevin McNaughton quickly cleared the ball away just after it entered the goal.

Scorelines
Record win: 13–0:
Stockport County 13–0 Halifax Town (Third Division North, 6 January 1934)
Newcastle United 13–0 Newport County (Second Division, 5 October 1946)
Record win in top division: 12–0, joint record:
West Bromwich Albion 12–0 Darwen (First Division, 4 April 1892)
Nottingham Forest 12–0 Leicester Fosse (First Division, 21 April 1909)
Record away win: Port Vale 0–10 Sheffield United (Second Division, 10 December 1892)
Record away win in top division: Southampton 0–9 Leicester City (Premier League, 25 October 2019)
Highest aggregate score: Tranmere Rovers 13–4 Oldham Athletic (Third Division North, 26 December 1935)
Highest scoring draw: 6–6, joint record:
Leicester City 6–6 Arsenal (First Division, 21 April 1930)
Charlton Athletic 6–6 Middlesbrough (Second Division, 22 October 1960)
Most double figure league wins by a team: 5, Birmingham City (12–0 v Walsall, 17 December 1892; 10–2 v Manchester City, 17 March 1894; 10–1 v Blackpool, 2 March 1901; 12–0 v Doncaster Rovers, 11 April 1903; 11–1 v Glossop, 6 January 1915) (all Second Division)
Most goals scored by a losing side: 6 by Huddersfield Town losing 7–6 to Charlton Athletic (21 December 1957)

Disciplinary
Most red cards in a single match: 5, joint record:
 Chesterfield (2) v. Plymouth Argyle (3) (22 February 1997)
 Wigan Athletic (1) v. Bristol Rovers (4) (2 December 1997)
 Exeter City (3) v. Cambridge United (2) (23 November 2002)
 Bradford City (3) v. Crawley Town (2) (27 March 2012) (all after the final whistle)
Most red cards in a career (individual): 13, joint record:
 Roy McDonough (Colchester United, Exeter City, Southend United),
 Steve Walsh (Wigan Athletic and Leicester City)
Fastest red card: 13 seconds, Kevin Pressman (Sheffield Wednesday v Wolverhampton Wanderers, 13 August 2000)
Fastest yellow card: 3 seconds, Vinnie Jones (Chelsea v Sheffield United, 21 March 1992)
Fastest red card for a substitute on the field of play: 0 seconds, joint record:
 Walter Boyd (Swansea City, 12 March 2000),
 Keith Gillespie (Sheffield United, 20 January 2007)
Both players came on as a substitute and elbowed/pushed an opponent before the game had been restarted.

Transfers

Highest transfer fee received: £142 million:
Philippe Coutinho, from Liverpool to Barcelona (7 January 2018)
Highest transfer fee paid: £106.8 million:
Enzo Fernandez, from Benfica to Chelsea

Individual

Appearances

Most titles won by an individual player: 13, Ryan Giggs 
Most career league appearances: 1,005 (849 in First Division), Peter Shilton (1966 to 1997)
Most career league appearances by an outfield player: 931, Tony Ford (1975 to 2002)
Most career league appearances at one club: 770, John Trollope (Swindon Town, 1960–1980) 
Most career top-flight league appearances at one club: 672, Ryan Giggs (Manchester United, 2 March 1991 to 6 May 2014)
Most career consecutive league appearances: 375, Harold Bell (Tranmere Rovers), 1946 to 1955 (401 consecutive club games including 26 FA Cup appearances)
Oldest player: Neil McBain, 51 years and 20 days (for New Brighton v. Hartlepool United, 1947)
Youngest player: Reuben Noble-Lazarus, 15 years and 45 days (for Barnsley v. Ipswich Town, 30 September 2008)
Oldest top-flight player: Stanley Matthews, 50 years and 5 days (for Stoke City v. Fulham, 6 February 1965)
Youngest top-flight player: Ethan Nwaneri, 15 years and 181 days (for Arsenal v. Brentford, 18 September 2022)

Goals

Most career league goals: 434, Arthur Rowley (619 matches, for West Bromwich Albion, Fulham, Leicester City and Shrewsbury Town, 1946 to 1965)
Most career top-flight goals: 357, Jimmy Greaves (516 matches, for Chelsea, Tottenham Hotspur and West Ham United, 1957 to 1971)
Most consecutive top flight league matches scored in: 15 Stan Mortensen for Blackpool 1950-51
Most league goals in a season: 60, Dixie Dean (39 matches, for Everton, 1927 to 1928)
Most goals in a game: 10, Joe Payne (for Luton Town v. Bristol Rovers, 13 April 1936)
Most goals in a top-flight game: 7, Ted Drake for Arsenal v. Aston Villa (away), 14 December 1935
Fastest goal: 3.5 seconds, Colin Cowperthwaite (for Barrow v. Kettering Town, 1979)
Fastest goal on a League debut: 7 seconds, Freddy Eastwood (for Southend United v. Swansea City, 16 October 2004)
Fastest hat-trick (time between first and third goals): 2 minutes 21 seconds, James Hayter (for Bournemouth v. Wrexham, 23 February 2004)
Fastest goal by a substitute: 6 seconds, Nicklas Bendtner (for Arsenal v. Tottenham Hotspur, 22 December 2007)
Fastest player to 100 English top flight goals Dave Halliday – 101 games
Players to score over 30 league goals in four consecutive seasons Dave Halliday – 1925–29. Halliday in fact scored at least 35 goals in each of those four seasons.
Most own goals in one season: 5, Bobby Stuart (Middlesbrough, 1934–35)
Most hat-tricks in one season: 9, George Camsell (Middlesbrough, 1926–27)
Most career hat-tricks: 37, Dixie Dean (Tranmere Rovers, Everton, 1923–1937)
Longest goalkeeping run without conceding a goal: 1,311 minutes, Edwin van der Sar (for Manchester United, 2008–09)
Youngest goalscorer: Ronnie Dix, 15 years and 180 days (for Bristol Rovers v. Norwich City, 3 March 1928)
Youngest top-flight goalscorer: Jason Dozzell, 16 years and 57 days (for Ipswich Town v. Coventry City, February 1984)
Youngest hat-trick goalscorer: Trevor Francis, 16 years and 317 days (for Birmingham City v. Bolton Wanderers, 20 February 1971, Division 2)

FA Cup

Final

Team

Most wins: 14, Arsenal (1930, 1936, 1950, 1971, 1979, 1993, 1998, 2002, 2003, 2005, 2014, 2015, 2017, 2020)
Most consecutive wins: 3, joint record:
Wanderers (1876, 1877, 1878)
Blackburn Rovers (1884, 1885, 1886)
Most consecutive defeats in finals: 3, Chelsea (2020, 2021, 2022)
Most appearances in finals: 21, Arsenal (1927, 1930, 1932, 1936, 1950, 1952, 1971, 1972, 1978, 1979, 1980, 1993, 1998, 2001, 2002, 2003, 2005, 2014, 2015, 2017, 2020)
Most Final appearances without win: 2, joint record:
Queen's Park (1884, 1885)
Birmingham City (1931, 1956)
Watford (1984, 2019)
Crystal Palace (1990, 2016)
Most Final appearances without defeat: 5, Wanderers (1872, 1873, 1876, 1877, 1878)
Longest winning streak in Finals: 7, joint record:
Tottenham Hotspur (1901, 1921, 1961, 1962, 1967, 1981, 1982)
Arsenal (2002, 2003, 2005, 2014, 2015, 2017, 2020)
Biggest win: 6 goals, joint record: 
Bury 6–0 Derby County (1903)
Manchester City 6–0 Watford (2019)
Most goals in a final: 7:
Blackburn Rovers 6–1 Sheffield Wednesday (1890)
Blackpool 4–3 Bolton Wanderers (1953)
Most goals by a runner-up: 3:
Bolton Wanderers: Lost 3–4 against Blackpool (1953)
West Ham United: Drew 3–3 but lost in a penalty shoot-out against Liverpool (2006)
Most defeats in finals: 8, joint record:
Everton (1893, 1897, 1907, 1968, 1985, 1986, 1989, 2009)
Chelsea (1915, 1967, 1994, 2002, 2017, 2020, 2021, 2022)
Manchester United (1957, 1958, 1976, 1979, 1995, 2005, 2007, 2018)

Individual

Most wins: 7, Ashley Cole (Arsenal) (2002, 2003, 2005) & (Chelsea) (2007, 2009, 2010, 2012)
Most appearances in finals: 9, Arthur Kinnaird (Wanderers) (1872–73, 1874–75, 1875–76, 1876–77, 1877–78) & (Old Etonians) (1878–79, 1880–81, 1881–82, 1882–83)
Most goals in a final: 3, Billy Townley (Blackburn Rovers, 1890), James Logan (Notts County, 1894) & Stan Mortensen (Blackpool, 1953)
Most goals in finals: 5, Ian Rush (Liverpool) (2 in 1986, 2 in 1989, 1 in 1992)
Most finals scored in: 4, Didier Drogba (Chelsea) (1 each in 2007, 2009, 2010, 2012)
Youngest FA Cup finalist: Curtis Weston, aged 17 years and 119 days (for Millwall v. Manchester United, 2004)
Youngest player to score in an FA Cup Final: Norman Whiteside, aged 18 years and 19 days (for Manchester United v. Brighton & Hove Albion, 1983)
Oldest FA Cup finalist: Billy Hampson, aged 41 years and 257 days (for Newcastle United v. Aston Villa, 1923–24)

All rounds

Most FA Cup goals conceded: 541: Aston Villa
Most FA Cup goals scored: 910: Tottenham Hotspur
Highest FA Cup goal difference: +365: Manchester United
Most FA Cup games played: 485: Arsenal
Most FA Cup games won: 271: Arsenal
Most FA Cup games lost: 133: Notts County
Most FA Cup games drawn: 108: Tottenham Hotspur
Largest margin of a win: Preston North End 26–0 Hyde (First round, 15 October 1887)
Largest margin of an away win: Clapton 0–14 Nottingham Forest (First round, 17 January 1891) and Boston United 0–14 Spalding United (First Qualifying Round, 1964)
Largest margin of an away win by a non-league club against a league club: Derby County 1–6 Boston United (Second round, 1955–56)
Most clubs competing for trophy in a season: 763 (2011–12)
Longest tie: 660 minutes (6 matches in total), Oxford City v. Alvechurch (Fourth Qualifying Round, 1971–72; Alvechurch won the sixth match 1–0)
Longest penalty shoot-out: 20 penalties each, Tunbridge Wells v. Littlehampton Town (Preliminary Round Replay, 31 August 2005; Tunbridge Wells won 16–15)
Most rounds played in a season: 9, joint record:
Brighton & Hove Albion (1932–33: 1st–4th Qualifying Rounds, 1st–5th Rounds)
New Brighton (1956–57: Preliminary, 1st–4th Qualifying Rounds, 1st–4th Rounds)
Blyth Spartans (1977–78: 1st–4th Qualifying Rounds, 1st–5th Rounds)
Harlow Town (1979–80: Preliminary, 1st–4th Qualifying Rounds, 1st–4th Rounds)
Most games played in a season: 13, Bideford (1973–74: one First Qualifying, two Second Qualifying, five Third Qualifying, four Fourth Qualifying and one First Round)
Fastest goal: 4 seconds, Gareth Morris (for Ashton United v. Skelmersdale United, 17 September 2001)
Most consecutive games without defeat: 22, Blackburn Rovers (1884–1886)
Most consecutive games without defeat: (Excluding defeat by penalty shoot-out) 29, Chelsea (2009–13)
Fastest hat-trick: 2 min 20 sec, Andy Locke (for Nantwich Town v. Droylsden, 1995)
Most Career Goals: 49, Henry "Harry" Cursham (Notts County between 1877 and 1888).
Most goals by a player in a single FA Cup season: 15, Sandy Brown (for Tottenham Hotspur, 1900-01).
 
Top scorers

The table includes all players to have scored 20 or more goals.

Most goals by a player in a single FA Cup game: 9, Ted MacDougall (for Bournemouth in 1971)
Scoreline: Two examples of teams scoring 7 goals and not winning – Dulwich Hamlet 8–7 St Albans City (Fourth Qualifying Round Replay, 22 November 1922), and Dulwich Hamlet 7–7 Wealdstone (Fourth Qualifying Round, 16 November 1929).
Youngest player: Andy Awford, 15 years and 88 days (for Worcester City v. Boreham Wood, Third qualifying round, 1987–88),
Youngest goalscorer: Sean Cato, 16 years and 25 days (for Barrow Town v. Rothwell Town, 2011–12)
Youngest goalscorer (proper rounds): George Williams, 16 years, 2 months and 5 days (for Milton Keynes Dons v. Nantwich Town, 2011–12) 
 Biggest gap between two teams in an FA Cup match: 161 difference in rank between 8th-tier Marine and Premier League Tottenham Hotspur, Third Round Proper, 10 January 2021.

League Cup

Final
Most wins (team): 9
Liverpool (1981, 1982, 1983, 1984, 1995, 2001, 2003, 2012, 2022)
Most consecutive wins (team): 4
Liverpool (1981, 1982, 1983, 1984)
Manchester City (2018, 2019, 2020, 2021)
Largest margin of win in a final: 5 goals: Swansea City 5–0 Bradford City (2013)
Most goals in a final (one-off match): 5 goals (joint record)
Queens Park Rangers 3–2 West Bromwich Albion (1967)
Aston Villa 3–2 Everton (1977, second replay)
Nottingham Forest 3–2 Southampton (1979)
Luton Town 3–2 Arsenal (1988)
Chelsea 3–2 Liverpool (2005)
Swansea City 5–0 Bradford City (2013)
Manchester United 3–2 Southampton (2017)
Most appearances (team): 13, Liverpool (1978, 1981, 1982, 1983, 1984, 1987, 1995, 2001, 2003, 2005, 2012, 2016, 2022)
Most wins (player): 6, Sergio Agüero and Fernandinho (Manchester City; 2014, 2016, 2018, 2019, 2020, 2021)
Most wins (manager): 4
Brian Clough (Nottingham Forest; 1978, 1979, 1989, 1990)
Alex Ferguson (Manchester United; 1992, 2006, 2009, 2010)
José Mourinho (Chelsea; 2005, 2007, 2015, Manchester United; 2017)
Pep Guardiola (Manchester City; 2018, 2019, 2020, 2021)
Most defeats in finals: 6, Arsenal (1968, 1969, 1988, 2007, 2011, 2018)
Most appearances without winning: 2
West Ham United (1966, 1981)
Everton (1977, 1984)
Bolton Wanderers (1995, 2004)
Sunderland (1985, 2014)
Southampton (1979, 2017)
Lowest ranked winners: Queens Park Rangers (1967) and Swindon Town (1969) – Third Division (now EFL League One)
Lowest ranked finalists: Rochdale (1962) – Fourth Division (now EFL League Two) and Bradford City (2013) – EFL League Two
Fastest goal in League Cup Final: 45 seconds, John Arne Riise (Liverpool v. Chelsea in 3–2 defeat, 2005)

All rounds
Most League Cup games played: Aston Villa, 256
Most League Cup games won: Aston Villa, 149
Most League Cup games drawn: Liverpool, 59
Most League Cup games lost: Brentford,77
Biggest win in a match: 10–0, joint record:
West Ham United 10–0 Bury (Second round, second leg, 25 October 1983)
Liverpool 10–0 Fulham (Second round, first leg, 23 September 1986)
Biggest win in aggregate: by 11 goals, joint record:
Liverpool 13–2 Fulham (10–0 First leg & 3–2 Second leg, 1986)
Bury 1–12 West Ham United (1–2 First leg & 0–10 Second leg, 1983)
Liverpool 11–0 Exeter City (5–0 First leg & 6–0 Second leg, 1981)
Watford 11–0 Darlington (8–0 First leg & 3–0 Second leg, 1987)
Everton 11–0 Wrexham (5–0 First leg: Away & 6–0 Second leg: Home, 1990)
Most career goals: 49:
Ian Rush (Liverpool, Newcastle United 1980 to 1999)
Most goals in a single match: 6, Frankie Bunn (for Oldham Athletic v. Scarborough, 25 October 1989, in their 7–0 win)
Most goals by a losing side: Reading (5), Reading v. Arsenal, 30 October 2012 in their 5–7 defeat (after extra time)
Most goals by a side without winning: Dagenham & Redbridge (6), Brentford v. Dagenham & Redbridge, 11 August 2014 in a 6–6 draw (Brentford won 4–2 on penalties).

All-time top scorers

FA Charity / Community Shield

Final
Most wins (team): 21 (17 outright, 4 shared), Manchester United (1908, 1911, 1952, 1956, 1957, 1965, 1967, 1977, 1983, 1990, 1993, 1994, 1996, 1997, 2003, 2007, 2008, 2010, 2011, 2013, 2016)
Most appearances (team): 30, Manchester United (1908, 1911, 1948, 1952, 1956, 1957, 1963, 1965, 1967, 1977, 1983, 1985, 1990, 1993, 1994, 1996, 1997, 1998, 1999, 2000, 2001, 2003, 2004, 2007, 2008, 2009, 2010, 2011, 2013, 2016)
Record scoreline: Manchester United 8–4 Swindon Town in 1911
Most wins (individual): 9, Ryan Giggs all outright wins (1993, 1994, 1996, 1997, 2003, 2007, 2008, 2010, 2013)
Most appearances (individual): 15, Ryan Giggs of Manchester United (1993, 1994, 1996, 1997, 1998, 1999, 2000, 2001, 2003, 2004, 2007, 2008, 2009, 2010, 2013)
Most defeats (individual): 6, Ryan Giggs (1998, 1999, 2000, 2001, 2004, 2009)
Most consecutive wins: 4, Everton (1984, 1985, 1986 (shared), 1987)
Most consecutive defeats: 4, Manchester United (1998, 1999, 2000, 2001)
Most consecutive appearances: 6, Manchester United (1996, 1997, 1998, 1999, 2000, 2001)
Most consecutive appearances (individual): 6, Ryan Giggs (1996, 1997, 1998, 1999, 2000, 2001)
Most goals: 6, Harold Halse (Manchester United), Dixie Dean (Everton)

All competitions

Fastest century of goals scored during a Premier League season (in fewest no. of games played): 103 goals scored in 34 games by Manchester City in season 2013–14. Previous record: 100 goals scored in 42 games by Chelsea in season 2012–13 (excludes games played / goals scored in FA Community Shield (1/2), UEFA Super Cup (1/1) and FIFA Club World Cup (2/3)).
Fastest century of goals scored during a Premier League season (in elapsed calendar days): 103 goals scored on 18 January 2014 by Manchester City in 2013–14. Previous record: 100 goals scored on 21 February 2013 by Chelsea in season 2012–13 (excludes games played / goals scored in FA Community Shield (1/2), UEFA Super Cup (1/1) and FIFA Club World Cup (2/3)).
Most consecutive penalty shoot-out wins: 9 by Bradford City between 6 October 2009 and 11 December 2012
Football League Cup (fifth round), 11 December 2012, Bradford City beat Arsenal 3–2 on penalties (score 1–1 after extra time)
FA Cup (second round proper replay), 13 November 2012, Bradford City beat Northampton Town 4–2 on penalties (score 3–3 after extra time)
Football League Cup (fourth round), 30 October 2012, Bradford City beat Wigan Athletic 4–2 on penalties (score 0–0 after extra time)
Football League Trophy (second round), 9 October 2012, Bradford City beat Hartlepool United 3–2 on penalties (score 0–0 after normal time)
Football League Trophy (quarter-finals), 8 November 2011, Bradford City beat Sheffield United 6–5 on penalties (score 1–1 after normal time)
Football League Trophy (second round), 4 October 2011, Bradford City beat Huddersfield Town 4–3 on penalties (score 2–2 after normal time)
Football League Trophy (first round), 30 August 2011, Bradford City beat Sheffield Wednesday 3–1 on penalties (score 0–0 after normal time)
Football League Trophy (quarter-finals), 10 November 2009, Bradford City beat Port Vale 5–4 on penalties (score 2–2 after normal time)
Football League Trophy (second round), 6 October 2009, Bradford City beat Notts County 3–2 on penalties (score 2–2 after normal time)
Fastest penalty awarded: 6 seconds. Chester v Witton Albion – 13 December 2016. Referee Joseph Johnson awarded a penalty when Blaine Hudson upended Tolani Omotola after 6 seconds.

Attendance records
Record attendance: 126,047 – Bolton Wanderers v West Ham United played at Wembley FA Cup Final (28 April 1923).
Record attendance at club ground: 121,919 – Aston Villa v Sunderland played at Crystal Palace FA Cup Final (19 April 1913).
Record home attendance: 85,512 – Tottenham Hotspur v Bayer Leverkusen played at Wembley UEFA Champions League (2 November 2016).
Record home attendance at own stadium: 84,569 – Manchester City v Stoke City played at Maine Road FA Cup R6 (3 March 1934).
Record league attendance: 83,260 – Manchester United v Arsenal played at Maine Road First Division (17 January 1948).
Record Premier League attendance: 83,222 – Tottenham Hotspur v Arsenal played at Wembley Stadium (10 February 2018).
Record league attendance at own stadium: 82,905 – Chelsea v Arsenal played at Stamford Bridge First Division (12 October 1935).
Record attendance at new Wembley: 89,874 – Portsmouth v Cardiff FA Cup Final (17 May 2008).
Record lowest attendance: 0 – COVID-19 pandemic in the United Kingdom
Record lowest attendance (Without COVID): 469 – Thames v Luton Town played at West Ham Stadium Third Division South (6 December 1930).

List of English record competition winners

These tables list the clubs that have won honours an English record number of times. It lists all international competitions organised by UEFA and FIFA as well as competitions organised by the English governing bodies the English Football League, the Premier League, and The Football Association.

Ongoing competitions

Discontinued competitions
This table follows the elite criteria above. It also includes any competitions that were not directly run by the governing bodies but were precursors to such competitions. Note: Inter-Cities Fairs Cup was replaced with UEFA Cup and Intercontinental Cup was replaced with FIFA Club World Cup.

Managers
Longest-serving manager at one club: Fred Everiss, 46 years (West Bromwich Albion 1902–1948)
Shortest-serving manager at one club (excluding caretakers): Leroy Rosenior, 10 minutes (Torquay United, 17 May 2007)
Most trophy wins: Sir Alex Ferguson, 38 (Manchester United)
Most League title wins: Sir Alex Ferguson, 13 (Manchester United)
Most FA Cup wins: Arsène Wenger, 7 (Arsenal)
Most League Cup wins: 4, joint record:
Brian Clough with Nottingham Forest
Sir Alex Ferguson with Manchester United
Pep Guardiola with Manchester City
José Mourinho with Chelsea (3) and Manchester United (1)
Most FA Charity/Community Shield wins: Sir Alex Ferguson, 10 (9 outright, 1 shared) (Manchester United)
Most Intercontinental Cup / FIFA Club World Cup wins: Sir Alex Ferguson, 2 (Manchester United)
Most European Cup / UEFA Champions League wins: Bob Paisley, 3 (Liverpool)*
Most Inter-Cities Fairs Cup / UEFA Cup / Europa League wins: Don Revie, 2 (Leeds United)
Most top-flight League game wins: Sir Alex Ferguson, 625 games (Manchester United)
Most European Cup / UEFA Champions League game wins: Sir Alex Ferguson, 110 games (Manchester United)

Footnotes

See also
List of football clubs in England by competitive honours won
England national football team records and statistics
Premier League records and statistics

References

External links
 

Football records and statistics in England
Records
England